Kate Foster (born 16 August 1985) is a British snowboarder. She has won the British half-pipe championship three times and she competed in the women's halfpipe event at the 2006 Winter Olympics.

Life
Foster was born in Canada and her brother James Foster is also a successful snowboarder and coach.

She competed in the women's halfpipe event at the 2006 Winter Olympics. 

In 2011 she won the British Halfpipe Championship for the third time. She also gained a silver at snowboardcross at the same event.

References

External links
 

1985 births
Living people
British female snowboarders
Olympic snowboarders of Great Britain
Snowboarders at the 2006 Winter Olympics
Sportspeople from Toronto